The 1993 NAIA Division I women's basketball tournament was the tournament held by the NAIA to determine the national champion of women's college basketball among its Division I members in the United States and Canada for the 1992–93 basketball season.

Defending champions Arkansas Tech defeated Union (TN) in the championship game, 76–75, to claim the Golden Suns' second NAIA national title.

The tournament was played at the Oman Arena in Jackson, Tennessee.

Qualification

The tournament field remained fixed at thirty-two teams, with the top sixteen teams receiving seeds. 

The tournament continue to utilize a simple single-elimination format.

Bracket

See also
1993 NAIA Division I men's basketball tournament
1993 NCAA Division I women's basketball tournament
1993 NCAA Division II women's basketball tournament
1993 NCAA Division III women's basketball tournament
1993 NAIA Division II women's basketball tournament

References

NAIA
NAIA Women's Basketball Championships
1993 in sports in Tennessee